Henry Benedict Thomas Edward Maria Clement Francis Xavier Stuart, Cardinal Duke of York (6 March 1725 – 13 July 1807) was a Roman Catholic cardinal, as well as the fourth and final Jacobite heir to publicly claim the thrones of Great Britain and Ireland. Unlike his father, James Francis Edward Stuart, and brother, Charles Edward Stuart, Henry made no effort to seize the thrones. After Charles's death in January 1788 the Papacy did not recognise Henry as the lawful ruler of Great Britain and Ireland, but referred to him as the Cardinal Duke of York.

He spent his life in the Papal States and had a long career in the clergy of the Roman Catholic Church, rising to become the Dean of the College of Cardinals and Cardinal-Bishop of Ostia and Velletri. At the time of his death he was (and still is) one of the longest-serving cardinals in the Church's history.

In his youth, Henry's father made him Duke of York (in the Jacobite peerage), and it was by this title that he was best known. Upon the death of his brother in 1788, Henry became known by Jacobites as Henry IX, although publicly he referred to himself as Cardinal called Duke of York (to indicate that while he was called Duke of York, he actually held another title).

Early life

Henry was born in exile at the Palazzo Muti in Rome on 6 March 1725 and baptised on the same day by Pope Benedict XIII, 37 years after his grandfather James II and VII lost the thrones, and ten years after his father's failed attempt to regain it. His father was James Francis Edward Stuart, known to his opponents as "the Old Pretender". His mother was the Princess Maria Klementyna Sobieska, granddaughter of the Polish King and Lithuanian Grand-Duke, John III Sobieski. Henry was apparently an intelligent child who could spell and write better than his older brother Charles. More introverted than Charles and more cautious in his approach to problems, Henry is described as pious and mild-mannered.

Henry went to France in 1745 to help his brother, Prince Charles Edward Stuart ("Bonnie Prince Charlie", or "the Young Pretender") prepare the Jacobite rising of 1745. Attached to the French army, he was in nominal command of a cross-channel invasion force of some 10,000 men that never made it out of Dunkirk, and subsequently served under Maurice de Saxe at the siege of Antwerp. After the defeat at Culloden, Henry Stuart returned to Italy.

Ecclesiastical career
On 30 June 1747 Pope Benedict XIV conferred the tonsure on him and created him Cardinal-Deacon of Santa Maria in Campitelli in a special consistory held on 3 July 1747. On 27 August 1747 he was promoted through the four minor orders by Benedict. He received the subdiaconate on 18 August 1748 and diaconate on 25 August 1748. His elder brother Charles, who was in France at the time, was not in favor of the ecclesiastical honors as he believed they would only serve to further religious prejudice against the Stuarts.

As the cardinalate was a rank rather than one of the priestly orders, Charles hoped that Henry might yet make a politically advantageous marriage, and was dismayed to discover that his brother had been ordained a priest on 1 September 1748. Later that month, Henry was made Cardinal-Priest, retaining his diaconal church. In 1751, he was made Arch-Priest of the Vatican Basilica.

 Louis XV of France bestowed on the Cardinal the abbeys of Auchin and St. Amand as compensation for having had to evict his brother pursuant to the terms of the Treaty of Aix-la-Chapelle.

In December 1752 his titular seat was changed to Santi Apostoli; and in 1758 the Pope named him Camerlengo of the Sacred College of Cardinals. The responsibilities of this office included administering all property, fees, funds and revenue belonging to the College of Cardinals, celebrating the requiem Mass for a deceased cardinal, and charge of the registry of the Acta Consistoralia. He participated in the conclave of 1758, which elected Pope Clement XIII. In October of that year he was made titular Archbishop of Corinth. The following year, he resigned the title of Santa Maria in Campitelli to assume that of Santa Maria in Trastevere; however, he retained the Church of Santi Apostoli in commendam.

He was made Cardinal-Bishop of Frascati on 13 July 1761. He was appointed Dean of the Sacred College of Cardinals on 26 September 1803, then also succeeding to the See of Ostia and Velletri. He lived and worked in Frascati for many years, descending each afternoon in his carriage to Rome, where his position as vice-chancellor entitled him to the Palazzo della Cancelleria.

Henry was the last claimant to the British throne to touch the sick to cure them from the King's Evil.

Henry is described as a beatific, abstemious, wealthy, celibate aesthete who lived to a great age, 'inoffensive and respectable' to the end.

French Revolution and later life

At the time of the French Revolution, he lost his French Royal benefices and sacrificed many other resources to assist Pope Pius VI. This, in addition to the seizure of his Frascati property by the French, caused him to descend into poverty. The British Minister in Venice arranged for Henry to receive an annuity of £4,000 from George III of Great Britain. Although the British government represented this as an act of charity, Henry and the Jacobites considered it to be a first installment on the money which was legally owed to him. (For many years the British government had promised to return the English dowry of his grandmother, Mary of Modena, but never did so.)

The Vatican had recognised James Francis Edward Stuart as James III and VIII as the King of Great Britain and Ireland. After his death in 1766 the Vatican did not recognise his son (Henry's brother) Charles, who had converted to Anglicanism in 1750. The Vatican had not, however, overtly recognised the Hanoverian monarchs. However, in November 1792 the Vatican first referred to George III as the King of Great Britain and Ireland instead of the Elector of Hanover. This resulted in a protest by Henry who suggested the insult would result in him not visiting Rome again.

Despite their general anti-clericalism and hostility to the Bourbon monarchy, the French Directory suggested to the United Irishmen in 1798 to elevate Henry as King of the Irish (Henry IX). This was in the course of General Humbert landing a force in County Mayo for the Irish Rebellion of 1798, and trying to rally the Catholic population: a significant number of Irish priests supported the Rising, even though Humbert's army had been veterans of the anti-clerical campaign in Italy. The French hoped Henry could lead a French client state in Ireland; however, Wolfe Tone, the Protestant republican leader, vetoed the scheme.
Henry returned to Frascati in 1803. In September of that year he became the Dean of the College of Cardinals and hence Cardinal Bishop of Ostia and Velletri, though he still lived in the episcopal palace at Frascati. He died there on 13 July 1807, aged 82.

Personal relationships

Some modern historians have explored whether Henry was homosexual. Contemporary accounts include the writings of Hester Lynch Thrale (1741–1821), and the diplomat and writer  (1740–1819). Gorani admitted to having gathered evidence insufficient to confirm his suspicions either way, but drew attention to the number of handsome clerics that were to be found in Henry's palace. The historian Andrew Lang alluded to James's comment that his younger son would never marry although many marriages had been planned for him.

The writer Gaetano Moroni provides the lengthiest account of Henry's close attachment with his majordomo Monsignor  (1722–1802), whom Henry was said to have "loved beyond measure". This led to serious tensions between the cardinal and his father James, who in 1752 tried to have Lercari dismissed from Rome. Henry reacted by attempting to secure his financial independence, and refused to return to Rome from Bologna without Lercari by his side. A public scandal was narrowly avoided by the intervention of Pope Benedict XIV. It was agreed that Lercari would leave the household, and he was later made Archbishop of Genoa.

Things became easier after the death of James in 1766. From 1769 onwards Henry remained close to Monsignor Angelo Cesarini, a nobleman from Perugia, who under Henry's protection won various honours, was made canon of the cathedral in Frascati, and in 1801 became Bishop of Milevi. Henry died with Cesarini at his side, as for the past 32 years. Cesarini was later buried in the church of Santa Maria in Vallicella.

These relationships may have had a romantic element.

Legacy

Under his will, which he signed as "Henry R" (i.e. Rex or king), he was succeeded in all his claimed British rights by his nearest blood-relative and friend, Charles Emmanuel IV of Sardinia. Like his successors, Charles neither asserted nor renounced his Jacobite claims. Charles Emmanuel and the succeeding kings of Sardinia had other vital interests in Italy which would have been harmed by pursuing a hopeless cause in Britain.

Contrary to popular belief, he did not leave the Crown Jewels to the Prince of Wales, afterwards George IV of the United Kingdom. All his property was entrusted to Monsignor Angelo Cesarini for distribution. Cesarini sent the Prince of Wales several jewels from Henry's private collection. These included a "Lesser George" (thought to have been worn by Charles I at his execution, and now at Windsor Castle) and a St Andrew's Cross (now at Edinburgh Castle), which are insignia of the orders of the Garter and the Thistle, and also a ruby ring. Nevertheless, this gift was not a formal renunciation of the Jacobite claim.

Henry, his brother, his father and his mother are buried in the crypt of St. Peter's Basilica in the Vatican. There is a monument to the Royal Stuarts on one of the columns in the basilica proper, designed by Antonio Canova. The monument was originally commissioned by Monsignor Angelo Cesarini, executor of Henry Benedict's estate. Among the subscribers, curiously, was George IV, who became an admirer of the Stuart legend.

The monument was restored at the expense of the late Queen Elizabeth the Queen Mother.

Titles, styles, honours and arms

Titles as cardinal

During his life, Cardinal Stuart was assigned the following Diaconia and Tituli:
 13 July 1747 Cardinal Deacon of Santa Maria in Portico
 16 September 1748 Cardinal Priest of Santa Maria in Portico
 18 December 1752 Cardinal Priest of Santi XII Apostoli
 12 February 1759 Cardinal Priest of Santa Maria in Trastevere
 13 July 1761 Cardinal Bishop of Frascati
 14 January 1763 Comendatario of San Lorenzo in Damaso (proper of the cardinal vice-chancellor, held in addition to the suburbicarian sees)
 26 September 1803 Cardinal Bishop of Ostia e Velletri (proper of the dean of the Sacred College of Cardinals)

In March 1774 he became Sub-dean, and on 15 September 1803 – Dean of the Sacred College of Cardinals.

He was a cardinal elector in the papal conclaves of 1758, 1769, 1774–75 and 1799–1800.

Arms
During the pretence of his father and brother, Henry claimed a coat of arms consisting of those of the kingdom, differenced by a crescent argent or white crescent.

Ancestors

See also
 Jacobite succession
 Touch pieces

References

Sources

 Reprinted:

Further reading

External links

  
 
 Henry Benedict Maria Clement Stuart Catholic Encyclopedia article
 
 Stuart of York, Henry Benedict Mary Clement (1725–1807) . Salvador Miranda.

1725 births
1807 deaths
18th-century Italian cardinals
18th-century Jacobite pretenders
19th-century Italian cardinals
Burials at St. Peter's Basilica
Cardinal-bishops of Frascati
Cardinal-bishops of Ostia
Clergy from Rome
Deans of the College of Cardinals
York, Henry Benedict, Duke of
Henry Benedict
Latin archbishops of Corinth
Peers created by James Francis Edward Stuart
Henry Benedict Stuart
Henry Benedict Stuart
Scottish cardinals